Conductivity (or specific conductance) of an electrolyte solution is a measure of its ability to conduct electricity. The SI unit of conductivity is Siemens per meter (S/m).

Conductivity measurements are used routinely in many industrial and environmental applications as a fast, inexpensive and reliable way of measuring the ionic content in a solution. For example, the measurement of product conductivity is a typical way to monitor and continuously trend the performance of water purification systems.

In many cases, conductivity is linked directly to the total dissolved solids (TDS).  High quality deionized water has a conductivity of about 0.05 μS/cm at 25 °C, typical drinking water is in the range of 200–800 μS/cm, while sea water is about 50 mS/cm (or 0.05 S/cm).

Conductivity is traditionally determined by connecting the electrolyte in a Wheatstone bridge. Dilute solutions follow Kohlrausch's Laws of concentration dependence and additivity of ionic contributions. Lars Onsager gave a theoretical explanation of Kohlrausch's law by extending Debye–Hückel theory.

Units

The SI unit of conductivity is S/m and, unless otherwise qualified, it refers to 25 °C. More generally encountered is the traditional unit of μS/cm.

The commonly used standard cell has a width of 1 cm, and thus for very pure water in equilibrium with air would have a resistance of about 106 ohms, known as a megohm. Ultra-pure water could achieve 18 megohms or more. Thus in the past, megohm-cm was used, sometimes abbreviated to "megohm". Sometimes, conductivity is given in "microsiemens" (omitting the distance term in the unit). While this is an error, it can often be assumed to be equal to the traditional μS/cm.

The conversion of conductivity to the total dissolved solids depends on the chemical composition of the sample and can vary between 0.54 and 0.96.  Typically, the conversion is done assuming that the solid is sodium chloride; 1 μS/cm is then equivalent to about 0.64 mg of NaCl per kg of water.

Molar conductivity has the SI unit S m2 mol−1. Older publications use the unit Ω−1 cm2 mol−1.

Measurement 

The electrical conductivity of a solution of an electrolyte is measured by determining the resistance of the solution between two flat or cylindrical electrodes separated by a fixed distance. An alternating voltage is generally used in order to minimize water electrolysis.  The resistance is measured by a conductivity meter. Typical frequencies used are in the range 1–3 kHz. The dependence on the frequency is usually small, but may become appreciable at very high frequencies, an effect known as the Debye–Falkenhagen effect.

A wide variety of instrumentation is commercially available. Most commonly, two types of electrode sensors are used, electrode-based sensors and inductive sensors. Electrode sensors with a static design are suitable for low and moderate conductivities, and exist in various types, having either two or four electrodes, where electrodes can be arrange oppositely, flat or in a cylinder. Electrode cells with a flexible design, where the distance between two oppositely arranged electrodes can be varied, offer high accuracy and can also be used for the measurement of highly conductive media. Inductive sensors are suitable for harsh chemical conditions but require larger sample volumes than electrode sensors. Conductivity sensors are typically calibrated with KCl solutions of known conductivity. Electrolytic conductivity is highly temperature dependent but many commercial systems offer automatic temperature correction.
Tables of reference conductivities are available for many common solutions.

Definitions 
Resistance, is proportional to the distance, between the electrodes and is inversely proportional to the cross-sectional area of the sample,  (noted  on the Figure above). Writing  (rho) for the specific resistance, or resistivity.

In practice the conductivity cell is calibrated by using solutions of known specific resistance, so the individual quantities  and  need not be known precisely, but only their ratio.

The specific conductance (conductivity),  (kappa) is the reciprocal of the specific resistance.

Conductivity is also temperature-dependent.
Sometimes the conductance (reciprocical of the resistance) is denoted as  = . Then the specific conductance  (kappa) is:

Theory 
The specific conductance of a solution containing one electrolyte depends on the concentration of the electrolyte. Therefore, it is convenient to divide the specific conductance by concentration. This quotient, termed molar conductivity, is denoted by

Strong electrolytes 
Strong electrolytes are hypothesized to dissociate completely in solution. The conductivity of a solution of a strong electrolyte at low concentration follows Kohlrausch's Law

(Limiting here means "at the limit of the infinite dilution".) In effect, the observed conductivity of a strong electrolyte becomes directly proportional to concentration, at sufficiently low concentrations i.e. when

As the concentration is increased however, the conductivity no longer rises in proportion.
Moreover, Kohlrausch also found that the limiting conductivity of an electrolyte;

The following table gives values for the limiting molar conductivities for some selected ions.

An interpretation of these results was based on the theory of Debye and Hückel, yielding the Debye–Hückel–Onsager theory:

As the name suggests, this is an extension of the Debye–Hückel theory, due to Onsager. It is very successful for solutions at low concentration.

Weak electrolytes 
A weak electrolyte is one that is never fully dissociated (there are a mixture of ions and complete molecules in equilibrium). In this case there is no limit of dilution below which the relationship between conductivity and concentration becomes linear. Instead, the solution becomes ever more fully dissociated at weaker concentrations, and for low concentrations of "well behaved" weak electrolytes, the degree of dissociation of the weak electrolyte becomes proportional to the inverse square root of the concentration.

Typical weak electrolytes are weak acids and weak bases. The concentration of ions in a solution of a weak electrolyte is less than the concentration of the electrolyte itself. For acids and bases the concentrations can be calculated when the value or values of the acid dissociation constant are known.

For a monoprotic acid, HA, obeying the inverse square root law, with a dissociation constant , an explicit expression for the conductivity as a function of concentration, known as Ostwald's dilution law, can be obtained.

Various solvents exhibit the same dissociation if the ratio of relative permittivities equals the ratio cubic roots of concentrations of the electrolytes (Walden's rule).

Higher concentrations 
Both Kohlrausch's law and the Debye–Hückel–Onsager equation break down as the concentration of the electrolyte increases above a certain value. The reason for this is that as concentration increases the average distance between cation and anion decreases, so that there is more interactions between close ions. Whether this constitutes ion association is a moot point. However, it has often been assumed that cation and anion interact to form an ion pair. So, an "ion-association" constant , can be derived for the association equilibrium between ions A+ and B−:
 A+ + B−  A+B−  with   = 
Davies describes the results of such calculations in great detail, but states that  should not necessarily be thought of as a true equilibrium constant, rather, the inclusion of an "ion-association" term is useful in extending the range of good agreement between theory and experimental conductivity data. Various attempts have been made to extend Onsager's treatment to more concentrated solutions.

The existence of a so-called conductance minimum in solvents having the relative permittivity under 60 has proved to be a controversial subject as regards interpretation. Fuoss and Kraus suggested that it is caused by the formation of ion triplets, and this suggestion has received some support recently.

Other developments on this topic have been done by Theodore Shedlovsky, E. Pitts, R. M. Fuoss, Fuoss and Shedlovsky, Fuoss and Onsager.

Mixed solvents systems 

The limiting equivalent conductivity of solutions based on mixed solvents like water alcohol has minima depending on the nature of alcohol.  For methanol the minimum is at 15 molar % water, and for the ethanol at 6 molar % water.

Conductivity versus temperature 
Generally the conductivity of a solution increases with temperature, as the mobility of the ions increases. For comparison purposes reference values are reported at an agreed temperature, usually 298 K (≈ 25 °C or 77 °F), although occasionally 20 °C (68 °F) is used. So called 'compensated' measurements are made at a convenient temperature but the value reported is a calculated value of the expected value of conductivity of the solution, as if it had been measured at the reference temperature. Basic compensation is normally done by assuming a linear increase of conductivity versus temperature of typically 2% per kelvin. This value is broadly applicable for most salts at room temperature. Determination of the precise temperature coefficient for a specific solution is simple and instruments are typically capable of applying the derived coefficient (i.e. other than 2%).

Measurements of conductivity  versus temperature can be used to determine the activation energy , using the Arrhenius equation:

 

where  is the exponential prefactor,  the gas constant, and  the absolute temperature in Kelvin.

Solvent isotopic effect 
The change in conductivity due to the isotope effect for deuterated electrolytes is sizable.

Applications 
Despite the difficulty of theoretical interpretation, measured conductivity is a good indicator of the presence or absence of conductive ions in solution, and measurements are used extensively in many industries. For example, conductivity measurements are used to monitor quality in public water supplies, in hospitals, in boiler water and industries which depend on water quality such as brewing. This type of measurement is not ion-specific; it can sometimes be used to determine the amount of total dissolved solids (TDS) if the composition of the solution and its conductivity behavior are known. Conductivity measurements made to determine water purity will not respond to non conductive contaminants (many organic compounds fall into this category), therefore additional purity tests may be required depending on application.

Applications of TDS measurements are not limited to industrial use; many people use TDS as an indicator of the purity of their drinking water. Additionally, aquarium enthusiasts are concerned with TDS, both for freshwater and salt water aquariums. Many fish and invertebrates require quite narrow parameters for dissolved solids. Especially for successful breeding of some invertebrates normally kept in freshwater aquariums—snails and shrimp primarily—brackish water with higher TDS, specifically higher salinity, water is required. While the adults of a given species may thrive in freshwater, this is not always true for the young and some species will not breed at all in non-brackish water.

Sometimes, conductivity measurements are linked with other methods to increase the sensitivity of detection of specific types of ions. For example, in the boiler water technology, the boiler blowdown is continuously monitored for "cation conductivity", which is the conductivity of the water after it has been passed through a cation exchange resin. This is a sensitive method of monitoring anion impurities in the boiler water in the presence of excess cations (those of the alkalizing agent usually used for water treatment). The sensitivity of this method relies on the high mobility of H+ in comparison with the mobility of other cations or anions.  Beyond cation conductivity, there are analytical instruments designed to measure Degas conductivity, where conductivity is measured after dissolved carbon dioxide has been removed from the sample, either through reboiling or dynamic degassing.

Conductivity detectors are commonly used with ion chromatography.

See also 
 Einstein relation (kinetic theory)
 Born equation
 Debye–Falkenhagen effect
 Law of dilution
 Ion transport number
 Ionic atmosphere
 Wien effect
 Conductimetric titration - methods to determine the equivalence point

References

Further reading

 Hans Falkenhagen, Theorie der Elektrolyte, S. Hirzel Verlag, Leipzig, 1971
 
 Conductivity of concentrated solutions of electrolytes in methyl and ethyl alcohols
 Concentrated solutions and ionic cloud model
 H. L. Friedman, F. Franks, Aqueous Simple Electrolytes Solutions

Electrochemical concepts
Physical chemistry